Mount Franke is a prominent mountain,  high, with much rock exposed on its north side, standing between Mount Wasko and Mount Cole along the west side of Shackleton Glacier in Antarctica. It was discovered and photographed by the United States Antarctic Service, 1939–41. It was surveyed by A.P. Crary in 1957–58 and named by him for Lieutenant Commander Willard J. Franke, of U.S. Navy Squadron VX-6, who wintered at Little America V in 1958.

References

Mountains of the Ross Dependency
Dufek Coast